Pablo Albano and Javier Frana were the defending champions, but none competed this year.

Olivier Delaître and Guy Forget won the title by defeating Diego Nargiso and Guillaume Raoux 6–2, 2–6, 7–5 in the final.

Seeds

Draw

Draw

References

External links
 Official results archive (ATP)
 Official results archive (ITF)

1994 ATP Tour
ATP Bordeaux